Maxim Cazmirciuc (born 20 February 1971) is a Moldovan butterfly and freestyle swimmer. He competed in three events at the 1996 Summer Olympics.

References

External links
 

1971 births
Living people
Moldovan male butterfly swimmers
Moldovan male freestyle swimmers
Olympic swimmers of Moldova
Swimmers at the 1996 Summer Olympics
Place of birth missing (living people)
20th-century Moldovan people
21st-century Moldovan people